Butterfly with Hiccups (also released as Line for Lyons) is an album by American jazz saxophonist Gerry Mulligan featuring performances recorded in 1963 and 1964 and first released on the Limelight label.

Reception

The Allmusic site awarded the album 3 stars.

Track listing
All compositions by Gerry Mulligan except as indicated
 "Butterfly with Hiccups" - 3:16
 "You'd Be So Nice to Come Home To" (Cole Porter) - 5:03
 "Theme for Jobim" - 3:43 	
 "Old Devil Moon" (Burton Lane, Yip Harburg) - 4:35 	
 "The Ant Hill" - 7:24
 "Blues for Lynda" - 3:39
 "Line for Lyons" - 3:15
 "Crazy Day" - 4:15

Personnel
Gerry Mulligan - baritone saxophone, piano
Art Farmer - flugelhorn (tracks 1, 4, 5 & 8)
Bob Brookmeyer - valve trombone
Jim Hall - guitar (tracks 1, 4, 5 & 8)
Bill Crow - bass
Dave Bailey - drums

References

Gerry Mulligan albums
1964 albums
Limelight Records albums
Albums produced by Hal Mooney